Max Bléneau (22 January 1934 – 30 October 2013) was a French professional racing cyclist. He rode in the 1959 and 1960 Tour de France.

References

External links
 

1934 births
2013 deaths
French male cyclists
People from La Roche-sur-Yon
Sportspeople from Vendée
Cyclists from Pays de la Loire